Posesión Airport ,  is an airport serving the oil and gas production facilities on the northern shore of Bahía Posesión, the Atlantic entrance to the Strait of Magellan. The airport is in the Magallanes Region of Chile.

West approach and departures are over the water.

See also

Transport in Chile
List of airports in Chile

References

External links
OpenStreetMap - Posesión
OurAirports - Posesión
FallingRain - Posesión Airport

Airports in Chile
Airports in Magallanes Region